Aceh Singkil Regency is a regency  in the Aceh province of Indonesia. It is situated largely on the island of Sumatra, but also includes the offshore Banyak Islands, the largest of which is Tuangku (Great Banyak), with the principal town of Alaban. Until 1999 it also included the large offshore island of Simeulue, but in that year the island was split off to create its own separate regency. The seat of the Aceh Singkil Regency government is at the port of Singkil on the Sumatra coast. The Regency covers an area of 1,857.88 km2, and had a population of 102,509 at the 2010 Census, rising to 114,326 at the 2015 Census and to 126,514 at the 2020 Census. The official estimate as at mid 2021 was 128,384.

Administrative divisions 

At the time of the 2010 Census, the regency was divided administratively into ten districts (kecamatan). Subsequent to 2010, the Banjak Islands District was divided into two, with a new Western Banjak Islands District (Kecamatan Pulau Banjak Barat) being carved out of the existing district, the residual district now essentially restricted to Pulau Balai. The districts are listed below with their areas and their populations at the 2010 Census and the 2020 Census, together with the official estimate as at mid 2021. The table also includes the locations of the district administrative centres, the number of villages (rural desa and urban kelurahan) and the number of offshore islands in each district, and its post code.

Note:(a) The 2010 population of Pulau Banyak Barat District is included in the 2010 figure for Pulau Banyak District, from which it was split out.

Tourism - Banyak Islands 
Banyak means "many" because there are 99 islands, of which only a few are inhabited. Yachts from Nias Island or directly from abroad carries foreign tourists to Big Palambak Island or Small Palambak Island for fresh water and snorkelling. Tailena Island, Rago-rago Island, Panjang (Long) Island and Matahari (Sun) Island are also suitable for scuba diving, while in Tuwanku (My Master) Island a conservation area for penyu hijau (green sea turtle) and penyu belimbing (leatherback sea turtle) is established.

See also 

 List of regencies and cities of Indonesia

References

External links 

 Aceh Singkil Tourism

Regencies of Aceh